Electronic Projects for Musicians is a b-sides and rarities compilation album by the indie rock band The Apples in Stereo. It was released April 1, 2008 under the Simian Records, Yep Roc Records, and Elephant 6 labels. It can be seen as a companion to Science Faire, a 1996 compilation that collects recordings from the band released prior to their first album.

Announced by frontman Robert Schneider in May 2007, Schneider described Electronic Projects for Musicians as having "all of our non-LP material since Fun Trick Noisemaker came out" — a time period that spans 12 years. Electronic Projects for Musicians does include most of the band's non-LP material released while the band was signed to spinART Records, excluding songs found on the Look Away + 4 and Let's Go! EPs, due to licensing issues.

The song "Dreams", an unfinished recording intended for release on the band's 1997 LP Tone Soul Evolution, is included on Electronic Projects for Musicians with newly recorded instrumentals.

In late 2007, fans were invited to remix the song "Can You Feel It?" from the most recent Apples LP, New Magnetic Wonder. Over 20 master tracks from the song's production were made available for download. The grand prize winning song (dubbed the "Mild Davis remix") was available for download with purchase of Electronic Projects for Musicians.

The title of the compilation comes from the book of the same name by Craig Anderton.

Track listing
All tracks composed by Robert Schneider except "Avril en Mai" (Schneider, Chris McDuffie)

Personnel

The Apples in Stereo
Robert Schneider - guitar, lead and backing vocals, keyboard, additional instrumentation.
John Hill - guitar, backing vocals, percussion.
Hilarie Sidney - drums, lead and backing vocals, percussion.
Eric Allen - bass, backing vocals, percussion.
Chris McDuffie - keyboard, backing vocals, additional instrumentation.

Production
Electronic Projects for Musicians was produced by Robert Schneider. It was engineered by The Apples in Stereo and Jim McIntyre, with assistant engineering by Ron Marschall. Songs were recorded on four-track, eight-track and sixteen track tape machines and/or utilized the Mainframe Computer at Pet Sounds Recording Studio in Denver, Colorado (1993–2002) and Lexington, Kentucky (2002–2006). The album was mastered from vinyl, flexi-disc, tape and digital sources by Fred Kevorkian in New York City.

Artwork for the album is by Steve Keene. Art photography by Joshua Kessler. Design by Dave Laney.

References

The Apples in Stereo albums
2008 compilation albums
The Elephant 6 Recording Company compilation albums
Yep Roc Records compilation albums